Corybas recurvus, commonly known as the western helmet orchid or common helmet is a species of terrestrial orchid endemic to Western Australia. It has round or heart-shaped leaf and a dark reddish purple or purplish black flower. It is widespread and common between Bunbury and Albany.

Description
The leaf is green on the upper surface and silvery green on the lower side. Flowering occurs from July to September.

Taxonomy
Corybas recurvus was first formally described in 1991 by David Jones from a specimen collected near Toolbrunup and the description was published in Australian Orchid Research. The specific epithet (recurvus) is a Latin word meaning "recurved" or "curved backwards ", referring to the flower of this orchid.

In 2002, David Jones and Mark Clements proposed splitting Corybas into smaller genera and placing this species into Corysanthes but the change has not been widely accepted.

Distribution and habitat
The western helmet orchid is widespread and common between Bunbury and Albany, growing in moist forests. It sometimes grows in large colonies in dense coastal scrub and in plantations of introduced pine.

Conservation
Corybas recurvus is classified as "not threatened" by the Government of Western Australia Department of Parks and Wildlife.

References

recurvus
Endemic orchids of Australia
Orchids of Western Australia
Plants described in 1991